Down These Strange Streets is an urban fantasy anthology edited by George R. R. Martin and Gardner Dozois and released on October 4, 2011.

Contents
 “The Bastard Stepchild” (Introduction) by George R. R. Martin
 “Death by Dahlia” by Charlaine Harris
 “The Bleeding Shadow” by Joe R. Lansdale
 “Hungry Heart” by Simon R. Green
 “Styx and Stones” by Steven Saylor
“Pain and Suffering” by S. M. Stirling
“It’s Still the Same Old Story” by Carrie Vaughn
 “The Lady Is a Screamer” by Conn Iggulden
 “Hellbender" by Laurie R. King
“Shadow Thieves” by Glen Cook
“No Mystery, No Miracle” by Melinda Snodgrass
“The Difference Between a Puzzle and a Mystery” by M. L. N. Hanover
 “The Curious Affair of the Deodand” by Lisa Tuttle
 Lord John and the Plague of Zombies by Diana Gabaldon (novella)
 “Beware the Snake” by John Maddox Roberts
 “In Red, With Pearls” by Patricia Briggs
 “The Adakian Eagle” by Bradley Denton

External links
 
 

2011 anthologies
Gardner Dozois anthologies
Ace Books books